Barrett Island is an ice-covered island about  long, lying just within the northern part of the mouth of Morgan Inlet, Thurston Island. It was mapped by the United States Geological Survey from surveys and from U.S. Navy air photos, 1960–66, and named by the Advisory Committee on Antarctic Names for Lieutenant (j.g.) Barry B. Barrett, a pilot of Squadron VX-6 on photographic flights during U.S. Navy Operation Deepfreeze 1964.

See also 
 List of Antarctic and sub-Antarctic islands

Maps
 Thurston Island – Jones Mountains. 1:500000 Antarctica Sketch Map. US Geological Survey, 1967.
 Antarctic Digital Database (ADD). Scale 1:250000 topographic map of Antarctica. Scientific Committee on Antarctic Research (SCAR), 1993–2016.

References 

Islands of Ellsworth Land